Jublains is a commune in the Mayenne department in north-western France.

History 
Jublains, formerly spelled Jubleins, is the site of ancient Noeodunum (also spelled Noiodunum or Noviodunum), the capital of the ancient Gallic tribe of the Diablintes, later occupied and settled by Romans and called Civitas Diablintum.  Noeodunum ( in Greek language sources), was the chief city of the Diablintes, or of the Aulircii Diaulitae, as the name appears in the Greek texts of Ptolemy (ii. 8. § 7). There is no doubt that the old Gallic name of the town was exchanged for that of the people, Diablintes - which Civitas Diablintum. In a middle age document, referred to by D'Anville, the town's name is written Jublent, and hence comes the corrupted name Jublains. Jublains is a small place not far from Mayenne, where some Roman remains have been discovered.

A name "Nudionnum" occurs in the Theodosian Table between Araegenus (modern Vieux in Calvados) and Subdinnum (modern Le Mans), and it is marked as a capital town. It appears to be the Noeodunum of the Diablintes, hence Jublains.

In an excavation in London a writing tablet was found with a note about a slave girl from Jublains. It read:

‘Vegetus, assistant slave of Montanus the slave of the August Emperor, has bought the girl Fortunata, by nationality a Diablintian, for 600 denarii. She is warranted healthy and not liable to run away ...’

See also
Jublains archeological site
Communes of the Mayenne department

References

Communes of Mayenne
Diablintes
Gallia Lugdunensis
Roman roads in Gaul